The World Group II was the second highest level of Fed Cup competition in 1995. Winning nations advanced to the World Group Play-offs, and the losing nations were demoted to the World Group II Play-offs.

Indonesia vs. Argentina

Australia vs. Slovakia

Italy vs. Canada

Netherlands vs. Sweden

References

See also
Fed Cup structure

World Group II